The 1995–96 Israeli Hockey League season was the fifth season of Israel's hockey league. Six teams participated in the league, and the Lions Jerusalem won the championship and HC Bat Yam ending as runners-up.

Regular season

External links 
 Season on hockeyarchives.info

Israeli League
Israeli League (ice hockey) seasons
Seasons